Chris or Christopher Kennedy may refer to:

Chris Kennedy (filmmaker) (1948–2013), Australian filmmaker and writer
Christopher G. Kennedy (born 1963), American businessman, son of Robert F. Kennedy
Christopher Kennedy (music editor), British music editor
Chris Kennedy (Colorado politician), member of the Colorado House of Representatives
Chris Kennedy (tennis) (born 1963), American professional tennis player